John Range Cartmell (28 August 1890 – 23 February 1979) was a professional footballer who played in the Football League for Brentford and Gillingham as an outside left. He later became trainer at Brentford and served nearly 30 years in the role. He was posthumously inducted into the Brentford Hall of Fame in May 2015.

Playing career 
An outside left, Cartmell began his career with spells at Huddersfield Town, Blackpool, Mardy and Abertillery, before the outbreak of the First World War in 1914 saw the suspension of competitive football the following year. Cartmell guested for Heart of Midlothian during the war and made 23 appearances, scoring two goals.

After the armistice, Cartmell joined Southern League First Division club Brentford in 1919. He made 30 appearances during the Bees' first season of league football in 1920–21, before leaving at the end of the campaign. Cartmell ended his career with Southern League club Boscombe and made a brief return to the Football League with Gillingham during the 1923–24 season.

Trainer career 
After his retirement from football in 1924, Cartmell remained at Gillingham as assistant to trainer Bob Kane. Cartmell returned to Brentford in 1926, when he followed Kane, manager Harry Curtis and a number of Gillingham players to Griffin Park. He progressed to become the club's lead trainer and remained with the Bees until the mid-1950s. Cartmell was rewarded for his long service with a testimonial match against Hayes in April 1955. He became trainer of Athenian League club Hayes in the mid-1950s.

Personal life 

Cartmell served in the Sportsmen's Battalions of the Royal Fusiliers during the First World War.

Career statistics

Honours 
Heart of Midlothian

 Rosebery Charity Cup: 1916–17

Individual

Brentford Hall of Fame

References

1890 births
English footballers
People from Blackpool
Huddersfield Town A.F.C. players
Brentford F.C. players
English Football League players
Southern Football League players
Mardy A.F.C. players
Association football outside forwards
Abertillery Town F.C. players
Heart of Midlothian F.C. wartime guest players
AFC Bournemouth players
Gillingham F.C. players
1979 deaths
Brentford F.C. non-playing staff
Blackpool F.C. players
British Army personnel of World War I
Royal Fusiliers soldiers
Military personnel from Lancashire